Justine Henin was the defending champion, but lost in the quarterfinals to Francesca Schiavone.

Elena Dementieva won in the final 4–6, 6–3, 6–2, against Svetlana Kuznetsova.

Seeds
The top four seeds receive a bye into the second round.

Draw

Finals

Top half

Bottom half

External links
Draw and Qualifying draw

2008 Dubai Tennis Championships
Dubai Tennis Championships